Haemosporidiasina (Haemosporidia) is a subclass of apicomplexans described by Jacques Euzéby in 1988. The taxon is very similar to Aconoidasida.

Taxonomy

Haemosporidiasina is divided into 2 orders:

Order Chromatorida (with pigmented intraerythrocytic parasites)

Suborder Laveraniina

Family Plasmodiidae
 Genus Bioccala Landau et al 1984
 Genus Biguetiella Landau et al 1984
 Genus Billbraya Paperna & Landau 1990
 Genus Dionisia Landau et al 1980
 Genus Hepatocystis Miller 1908
 Genus Mesnilium Misra, Haldar & Chakravarty 1972
 Genus Nycteria Garnham and Heisch 1953
 Genus Plasmodium Marchiafava & Celli 1885
 Genus Polychromophilus Landau et al 1984
 Genus Rayella Dasgupta 1967
 Genus Saurocytozoon Lainson & Shaw 1969
 Genus Vetufebrus Poinar 2011
Family Haemoproteidae
 Genus Johnsprentia Landau, Chavatte & Beveridge 2012
 Genus Haemocystidium Castellani and Willey 1904, emend. Telford 1996
 Genus Haemoproteus Kruse 1890 
 Genus Paleohaemoproteus Poinar and Telford 2005
 Genus Sprattiella Landau et al 2012

Order Achromatorida (with non-pigmented intraerythrocytic parasites)

Suborder Babesiina includes agents of piroplasmosis sensu stricto

Family Babesiidae This family excludes species that undergo schizogony in lymphocytes before parasitizing erythrocytes: such  species belong to the genus Theileria
Genus Babesia Starcovici 1893
Genus Entopolypoides Mayer 1933
Genus Echinozoon Garnham 1951
Genus Microbabesia  Sohns 1918
Genus Rangelia
Genus Tunetella Brumpt & Lavier 1935
Family Haemohormidiidae has several genera, including:
Genus Cardiosporidium Van Gaver & Stephan 1907
Genus Cristalloidophora Porchet 1978
Genus Dobellia Brumpt 1913
Genus Echinococcidium Brasil 1902
Genus Globidiellum Eisen 1895
Genus Haemohormidium Léger & Duboscq 1910
Genus Joyeuxella Brasil 1902
Genus Rhabdospora Landau, Boulard & Houin 1969
Genus Sauroplasma Starcovici 1893
Genus Spermatobium Garnham 1951
Genus Toxocystis Henry 1910
Genus Trophosphaera du Toit 1938

Suborder Theileriina includes parasites of erythrocytes and diverse white blood cells with sexual reproduction by exoerythrocytic or by exo- and endoerythrocytic schizogony.

Family Theileriidae du Toit 1918
Genus Theileria Bettencourt, Franca and Borges 1907
Family Leucocytozoidae Fallis and Bennett 1961
Genus Leucocytozoon
Family Garniidae Lainson, Landau and Shaw 1971
Genus Fallisia
Genus Garnia
Genus Progarnia

References

Apicomplexa
SAR supergroup subclasses